Cecil Gerard Alexander Paris (20 August 1911 in Kirkee, British India – 4 April 1998 in Winchester, Hampshire) was an English first-class cricketer. He was a right-handed batsman who bowled occasional right-arm off spin. In addition Paris was also a prominent cricket administrator.

Paris played for Hampshire from 1933-1948. He captained the county in the 1938 County Championship, his only season as captain. Paris also played for the Marylebone Cricket Club in 1939. No first-class cricket was played due to the Second World War, so it was six years until Paris could resume his first-class career with Hampshire in 1946. Paris retired from first-class cricket at the end of the 1948 County Championship.

Outside of playing for Hampshire Paris also held every office of note at the club: cricket chairman; club chairman; and president from 1984 to 1989. Paris was the first chairman of the Test and County Cricket Board, formed in 1968, then being nominated by Prince Philip to succeed him in 1975 as president of Marylebone Cricket Club (MCC) and chairman of the International Cricket Conference.

Outside cricket

Paris served in the Second World War with the 21st Army Group where he served as a Liaison officer for General Montgomery. During his role as a Liaison officer between Montgomery and the 1st Czechoslovak Armoured Brigade Paris was awarded the Czechoslovak War Cross, the Czech version of the British Military Cross. Paris was made a partner in his family's law firm Paris Smith and Randall, based in Southampton.

Paris died in Winchester, Hampshire aged 86 on 4 April 1998.

Foreign and international awards

External links
Cecil Paris at Cricinfo
Cecil Paris at CricketArchive

1911 births
Military personnel of British India
1998 deaths
English cricket administrators
Hampshire cricketers
Hampshire cricket captains
Marylebone Cricket Club cricketers
Cricketers from Pune
Presidents of the Marylebone Cricket Club
English cricketers
British Army personnel of World War II
Recipients of the Czechoslovak War Cross
Royal Artillery officers
Gentlemen cricketers
20th-century British lawyers
20th-century English lawyers
20th-century British businesspeople
British people in colonial India